Baliali is a village in Bawani khera tehsil of Bhiwani district of Indian state of Haryana. , the village had 2405 households with a population of 12,440 of which 6,562 were male and 5,878 female.

References

Villages in Bhiwani district